Indestructible in Germany is a live DVD by American heavy metal band Disturbed. It contains six live tracks from Disturbed's performance at Rock am Ring at Nürburgring, Germany, recorded on June 7, 2008.

Track listing 
All tracks written, arranged and performed by Disturbed.

Personnel 
David Draiman – lead vocals
Dan Donegan – guitar
Mike Wengren – drums
John Moyer – bass, backing vocals
Neal Avron – mixing
Paul Shyvers – director

References 

Disturbed (band) video albums
2008 video albums
Live video albums
2008 live albums
Reprise Records live albums
Reprise Records video albums